Law School of Baku State University, or Faculty of Law is one of the 16 schools (or faculties) of BSU.

History
According to the directions of Azerbaijan C (b)P in 1927 under the decision of administrative personnel of Azerbaijan State University and State Scientific Board of Public Education Commissariat of the Republic, the branch of law was made inside the Oriental Studies department of the University. In 1928 the Branch of law changed into the Faculty of Law. School of Law has an old history and educated thousands of lawyers.

International cooperation
The school has international cooperation with universities like Ankara University, Selcuk University, Moscow State University, Wurzburg University, GWU Law School and many others.

Departments 
 Department of Theory and History of Law
 Department of Constitutional Law
 Department of Civil Law
 Department of Civil Procedure and Commercial Law
 Department of Criminal Law
 Department of Public International Law
 "Unesco" Department of Human Rights and Information Law
 Department of Criminal Procedure
 Department of Private International and European Law
 Department of Labor and Social Security Law

Administration and student population
The school has more than 100 academic personnel; currently it has about 1900 students.

The dean is Prof. Amir Aliyev.

References

Universities in Baku
Law schools in Azerbaijan
Educational institutions established in 1927
1927 establishments in the Soviet Union